Climaveneta, a group company of Mitsubishi Electric, is an Italian HVAC and HPAC manufacturer based in Bassano del Grappa, Vicenza.

History 
Climaveneta is established in Bassano del Grappa in 1971. In 1982 “Energy Raiser” the first multi-purpose unit for combined heating and cooling in 4-pipe systems is launched on the Market. In 1990 The “Free Cooling Liquid Chillers” are introduced for process and computer room cooling. In 1993 Climaveneta acquires a new distributor for ICC&R in France and in the same year the company set up the Chinese joint venture. In 1994 Climaveneta joins the De'Longhi Group, four years later in 1998 the new branch Climaveneta Deutschland is established. 
In 2000 Climaveneta starts participating in Eurovent Certification, among the initiators, aligning Europe with the USA.

In 2004 the company started adopting the Lean manufacturing, introducing Kaizen continuous improvement process.

In 2007 Climaveneta launched Prana residential heat pumps, integrating alternative energy sources (air, water and ground) in medium & small systems.
In the same year the company acquires a distributor for Spain, the year later also for Poland. In the same years the company launched many new products strongly investing in inverter technology like the i-FOCS chiller with complete Inverter management of compressors, fans and heat pumps; the i-NRG heat pump with total heat recovery, the i-WHISPER ENTHALPY full inverter, full heat recovery rooftop unit. In 2011 Climaveneta acquires a distributor in UK and set up operations for HPAC and Air Handling units in Shanghai. In 2012 demerger from De’Longhi and DeLclima Group establishment.

The DeLclima group is set up. In the same year the company launched the plant control and optimization ClimaPro. In 2013 set up of operations for chillers and HPAC units in Bangalore and i-FX(1+i) new inverter chiller launching. In 2014 new branches in Russia and Middle East establishment.

In March 2016, following the acquisition by Mitsubishi Electric, DeLclima was renamed MELCO Hydronics & IT Cooling S.p.A.

Products and services 

Climaveneta produces Chillers and Heat Pumps, Air handling units (AHU), terminal units, control systems, rooftops and other packaged units, close controls.

Corporate social responsibility 

 Green Building Council: Climaveneta is a member of the Green Building Council Italy since 2011;
 Behavior-based safety (BBS): In June 2015 Climaveneta started the BBS safety management system in the Bassano del Grappa plant;
 BS OHSAS 18001: Company and product certifications play a crucial role within Climaveneta's approach to quality. With this respect in July 2015 Climaveneta got the BS OHSAS 18001 certification for all the plants in Italy.

References

External links 
 

Heating, ventilation, and air conditioning companies
Manufacturing companies established in 1971
1971 establishments in Italy
Italian brands
Companies of Italy
Companies based in Veneto